Catherine O’Loughlin is a camogie player, winner of six All-Star awards in 2005, 2007, 2008, 2010  and 2011 and 2012 and four-time winner of the All Ireland championship in 2007, 2010,2011 and 2012. She was nominated for further All-Stars in 2006, 2009. and  2010 and a member of the 2011 Team of the Championship. She won four All Ireland medals with Wexford in 2007, 2010 2011 and 2012

Other awards
National League Division one 2009; All Star 2005, 2007, 2008; She was an All Star nominee in 2006, Wexford Supporters' Club player of the year 2008; Ashbourne All Star 2005, 2006; Ashbourne Cup player of the tournament 2005; Junior Gael Linn Cup with Leinster 2001; Senior Gael Linn Cup with Leinster 2006; All-Ireland Junior Colleges with Coláiste Bríde 2000; Leinster Under-16 2000; Leinster Senior 2001, 2004, 2007; Leinster Junior 2003; Club Senior 'B' 2004, 2008; Purple and Gold Star 2008. Because she spent six months travelling abroad her third All Star award was collected on her behalf by her sister, Liz.

References

Living people
Wexford camogie players
Year of birth missing (living people)
UCD camogie players